Shuangjiangkou is a rural town in Ningxiang City, Hunan Province, China. It is surrounded by Chengjiao Subdistrict and Jinghuapu Township on the west, Jinzhou Town and Lijingpu Subdistrict on the southeast, Zhuliangqiao Township, Gaotangling Subdistrict and Jinggang Town of Wangcheng District on the northeast, and Henglongqiao Town on the northwest.

History
In December 2015, Zhuliangqiao Township was merged into Shuangjiangkou Town.

Administrative division
The Town is divided into 13 villages and four communities: 
 Shuangjiangkou Community
 Xinxiang Community
 Shuangfu Community
 Baiyu Community
 Tanshuwan
 Changxing
 Wuyi
 Shanyuan
 Shuangqing
 Gaotiansi
 Zuojiashan
 Zhuliangqiao
 Chaziqiao
 Lianhuashan
 Luoxiangxin
 Yunji
 Xingjia

Geography
The Wei River, known as "Mother River" and a tributary of the Xiang River, flows through the town.

Economy
Grape is important to the economy.

Education
There are one senior high school located with the town limits:Ningxiang Eleventh Senior High School.

Culture
Huaguxi is the most influence local theater.

Transportation
The Changchang Highway running through Shuangjiangkou Town, Chengjiao Township, Jinghuapu Township. The Jinzhou Highway from Yutan Subdistrict, running through Chengjiao Town, Shuangjiangkou Town, Jinzhou Town, to Yuelu District, Changsha City.

Attractions
The towm is famous for the tea.

Celebrity
Zhou Fengjiu, scientist.

References

External links

Divisions of Ningxiang
Ningxiang